These are the official results of the Women's Long Jump event at the 1984 Summer Olympics in Los Angeles, California. There were a total number of 23 participating athletes, with two qualifying groups, and the final held on August 6, 1984.

Medalists

Abbreviations
All results shown are in metres

Records

Qualification
Held on 5 August 1984

Final
Held on August 9, 1984

See also
 1982 European Athletics Championships – Women's long jump
 1983 World Championships in Athletics – Women's long jump
 Athletics at the Friendship Games – Women's long jump
 1986 European Athletics Championships – Women's long jump
 1987 World Championships in Athletics – Women's long jump

References

External links
 Official Report

L
Long jump at the Olympics
1984 in women's athletics
Women's events at the 1984 Summer Olympics